Jonathan Carmona "Jony" Álamo (born 25 September 2001) is a Spanish professional footballer who plays as a central midfielder for Elche CF.

Club career
Born in La Unión, Region of Murcia, Álamo joined Elche CF's youth setup from CD La Unión. On 15 December 2019, he made his senior debut with the reserves by coming on as a second-half substitute in a 3–2 Tercera División away win against UD Benigànim.

On 19 February 2020, Álamo renewed his contract until 2022. On 21 June, after being one of the youngsters called up to the first team by manager Pacheta after the COVID-19 pandemic, he further extended his contract until 2023.

Álamo made his professional debut with the Franjiverdes on 27 June 2020, replacing Dani Escriche late into a 1–1 away draw against UD Las Palmas in the Segunda División. He made his La Liga debut on 19 January of the following year, starting in a 2–2 away draw against Real Valladolid.

On 13 January 2022, Álamo moved on loan to Primera División RFEF side Cultural y Deportiva Leonesa until the end of the season.

References

External links
 
 
 

2001 births
Living people
Spanish footballers
Footballers from the Region of Murcia
Association football midfielders
La Liga players
Segunda División players
Primera Federación players
Tercera División players
Elche CF Ilicitano footballers
Elche CF players
Cultural Leonesa footballers